In mathematics, Ward's conjecture is the conjecture made by  that "many (and perhaps all?) of the ordinary and partial differential equations that are regarded as being integrable or solvable may be obtained from the self-dual gauge field equations (or its generalizations) by reduction".

Examples

 explain how a variety of completely integrable equations such as the Korteweg-de Vries equation or KdV equation, the Kadomtsev–Petviashvili equation or KP equation, the nonlinear Schrödinger equation, the sine-Gordon equation, the Ernst equation and the Painlevé equations all arise as reductions or other simplifications of the self-dual Yang-Mills equation

They also obtain the equations of an integrable system known as the Euler–Arnold–Manakov top, a generalization of the Euler top, and they state that the Kowalevsaya top is also a reduction of the self-dual Yang-Mills equations.

Penrose-Ward transform

Via the Penrose-Ward transform these solutions give the holomorphic vector bundles often seen in the context of algebraic integrable systems.

References

   http://www.ucl.ac.uk/~ucahrha/Publications/sdym-03.pdf

Integrable systems